

Art museums
 Museum of Illusions  (Nušićeva 11)  
 National Museum of Serbia  (Trg republike 1a) 
 Museum of African Art (Andre Nikolića 14)
 Museum of Applied Arts (Vuka Karadžica 18) 
 Museum of Contemporary Art (Ušće bb) 
 Legacy of Milica Zorić and Rodoljub Čolaković (Rodoljuba Čolakovića 2), part of Museum of Contemporary Art
 Belgrade City Museum (Resavska 40b) 
 Museum of Paja Jovanović, (Kralja Milana 21/VI) , part of Belgrade City Museum 
 Zepter Museum (Knez Mihailova 42) [www.zeptermuseum.rs]
 Gallery of Frescos, (Cara Uroša 20) , part of National Museum of Serbia

Cultural and historical museums
 Historical Museum of Serbia (Trg Nikole Pašića 11) [imus.org.rs/en/home]
 Museum of Yugoslav History (Mihaila Mike Jankovica 6) , with 3 buildings: House of Flowers (Tito's tomb), Old museum (Tito's gifts and documents about Yugoslavian history) and Museum 25 May (temporary exhibitions)
 Historical Museum of Genocide dedicated to the Serbian people (Trg Nikole Pašića 11)
 Jewish Historical Museum (Kralja Petra I 71/1)  
 Konak Kneginje Ljubice (Kneza Sime Markovića 3) , part of Belgrade City Museum 
 Konak Kneza Miloša (Rakovički put 2), part of Historical Museum of Serbia
 Military Museum (Kalemegdan)
 Museum of Belgrade Fortress (Kalemegdan)
 Museum of Ethnography (Studentski trg 13) 
 Museum of Vuk and Dositej, (Gospodar Jevremova 21) , part of National Museum of Serbia
 Museum of Pedagogy (Uzun Mirkova 14)
 Museum of Serbian Orthodox Church  
 Museum of the "Banjica" Concentration Camp (Veljka Lukića Kurjaka 3)
 Museum of Theatrical Arts (Gospodar Jevremova 19) 
 Museum of Yugoslav Film Archive (Kosovska 11)
 Zemun Home Museum (Glavna 9)
 House of Jevrem Grujic (Svetogorska 17)
 Museum of Roma culture of Belgrade (Husinske rudara 31, Karaburma)

Memorial museums and commemorative collections
 Manak's House (Gavrila Principa 5)
 Memorial Gallery of Petar Dobrović (Kralja Petra I 36/IV)
 Memorial Museum of Ivo Andrić (Andrićev venac 8/I), part of Belgrade City Museum 
 Memorial Museum of Jovan Cvijić (Jelene Ćetković 5), part of Belgrade City Museum 
 Memorial Museum of Nadežda and Rastko Petrović (Ljube Stojanovića 25), part of Belgrade City Museum 
 Museum of Archibald Reiss (Bulevar vojvode Mišića 73)
 Museum of FK "Crvena Zvezda" (Ljutice Bogdana 1a)
 Museum of Physical Education (Blagoja Parovića 156)
 Museum of Toma Rosandić (Vasilija Gaceše 3)

Technical and natural-history museums
 Museum of Automobiles (Majke Jevrosime 30)
 Museum of Aviation, near Belgrade Nikola Tesla Airport, has a collection consisting of 130 planes including the only remaining Fiat G.50 Freccia.
 Museum of Natural History (Njegoševa 51; Mali Kalemegdan 1)
 Museum of Science and Technology (Ðure Jakšica 9)  
 Nikola Tesla Museum (Krunska 51)  
 PTT Museum (Palmoticeva 2)
 Railway Museum (Nemanjina 6)

External links

Belgrade
Museums
Museums
Museums